Éveillé was a 2-deck 64-gun ship of the French Navy, laid down by A. Groignard in 1751 and launched at Rochefort in 1752. She was part of a naval shipbuilding boom between the end of the War of the Austrian Succession in 1748 and the start of the Seven Years' War in 1755. She took part in several battles before being paid off in 1771.

Career 
[[File:Louis Nicolas van Blarenberghe - L'avant-port de Brest.jpg|thumb|LÉveillé in Brest by Louis Nicolas van Blarenberghe]]
In 1762, Éveillé'' was a Newfoundland under Captain Monteil.

Notes, citations, and references NotesCitationsBibliography 
 
 
  (1671-1870)External links'''
 French Third Rate ship of the line Eveillé (1752) on Three Decks – Warships in the Age of Sail
  Vaisseaux de ligne français de 1682 à 1780, list by Ronald Deschênes on agh

Ships of the line of the French Navy
1752 ships